The Dog Ate My Homework is a British children's panel show hosted by Lauren Layfield. It was first broadcast on 17 January 2014 and was originally hosted by the comedian Iain Stirling. The show is produced by CBBC Productions Scotland for CBBC.

Series 2 began on 23 January 2015, with a Christmas special aired on 16 December 2015. Series 3 began on 8 January 2016 and series 4 began on 4 November 2016. A fifth series was filmed from 17 November to 10 December 2017. Series 6 was the first not to be aired on Fridays, with it airing from 2 February 2019 at 8.30am for 12 weeks. After this series, it was announced that Stirling was leaving the show.

In series 7, four different presenters hosted three episodes each. Hacker T. Dog was the first of these confirmed. Lauren Layfield, Suzi Ruffell and Darren Harriott also presented three episodes each. It was later announced that Layfield would host the show permanently from Series 8, joined by Reis Daniel playing the lovable Mr. Learner.

Format
The show features two teams, both with a CBBC star, a comedian and a child. They compete in various games and tasks. The winning team get a gold star. Stirling can take, or give, gold stars whenever he wants. He usually gives them when an answer makes him laugh. Whoever has the most gold stars wins the game.

Episodes

Series 1 (2014)

Series 2 (2015)

Christmas Special (2015)

Series 3 (2016)

Series 4 (2016–2017)

Series 5 (2018)

Series 6 (2019)

Series 7 (2019–2020)

Guest appearances
The following have all appeared multiple times as one of the guest panelists on the show.

11 appearances
 Susan Calman

9 appearances
 Dominique Moore

7 appearances
 Dodge T. Dog

6 appearances
 Victoria Cook
 Bec Hill
 Lauren Layfield
 Sam Nixon
 Romesh Ranganathan
 Alex Riley
 Mark Rhodes

5 appearances
 Charlie Baker
 Ashleigh Butler
 Johnny Cochrane
 Bobby Lockwood
 Chris Johnson
 Suzi Ruffell
 Hacker T. Dog
 Inel Tomlinson
 Naomi Wilkinson
 Dan Wright

4 appearances
 Matthew Crosby
 Ellie Taylor

3 appearances
 Steve Bugeja
 Jack Carroll
 Radzi Chinyanganya
 Tom Craine
 Marlon Davis
 Sam Fletcher
 Stuart Goldsmith
 Chris Martin
 Paul McCaffrey
 Ed Petrie
 Mawaan Rizwan
 Ben Shires

2 appearances
 James Acaster
 Tom Allen
 Dan Antopolski
 Aidan Davis
 Pippa Evans
 Ivo Graham
 Luke Kempner
 Grace Mandeville
 Ricky Martin
 Katie Mulgrew
 Gareth Richards
 Jess Robinson
 Joe Swash
 Phil Wang

Susan Calman, Dan Wright and Dodge T. Dog are the only panelists to have featured in every series. However, none of them featured in the stand-alone Christmas special. , Calman has not appeared in an episode of the show since Season 4.

The following have all made a single appearance as one of the guest panellists on the show:

 Michelle Ackerley
 Nihal Arthanayake
 Percelle Ascott
 Sam Battersea
 Ray Bradshaw
 Jarred Christmas
 Des Clarke
 Louisa Connolly-Burnham
 Rory Crawford
 Richard David-Caine
 Joel Dommett
 Martin Dougan
 JB Gill
 Storm Huntley
 Tez Ilyas
 Jermaine Jackman
 Yuriko Kotani
 Athena Kugblenu
 Katia Kvinge
 Lloyd Langford
 George Lewis
 Lucy & Lydia

 Shazia Mirza
 Oyiza Momoh
 Ore Oduba
 Shane O'Meara
 Funmbi Omotayo
 Katherine Ryan
 Lou Sanders
 Fran Scott
 Ahir Shah
 Ranj Singh
 Cel Spellman
 Chris Stark
 Kirstie Steele
 Sam Strike
 Katie Thistleton
 Leo Waddell

References

External links
 
 

2010s British children's television series
2020s British children's television series
BBC panel games
2010s British game shows
2020s British game shows
BBC television comedy
British panel games
English-language television shows
Television series by BBC Studios
2014 British television series debuts
BBC children's television shows
BBC high definition shows
CBBC shows